Societas Europaea Lepidopterologica (also known as SEL) is a European society for the study of moths and butterflies and for the conservation of these insects and their natural habitats. The society was founded in 1976 with the aims of promoting collaboration among the lepidopterists of Europe, Western Asia and North Africa, and of promoting conservation of Lepidoptera and their habitats. The society now has in excess of 600 members.

The membership of the Societas Europaea Lepidopterologica comprises a large proportion of the active European professional researchers in the fields of Lepidoptera systematics, morphology, behaviour, faunistics, biogeography, biodiversity, ecology and conservation biology. It similarly comprises a large proportion of the European "amateur specialists", whose contributions to the knowledge about this group of insects continues to be of paramount significance. For many SEL members Lepidoptera collecting is a major interest, and the society has a clear stand on this issue.

The Societas Europaea Lepidopterologica promotes research in lepidopterology and dissemination of the findings primarily through the arrangement of the biennial European Congresses of Lepidopterology and through the publication of the scientific journal Nota Lepidopterologica.  A newsletter, SELepidoptera News — Nouvelles — Nachrichten, serves the society.

The society was founded by Dr. Otakar Kudrna, a Czechoslovakian lepidopterist who escaped to England from communist Czechoslovakia to become Europe's foremost authority on butterfly taxonomy. Kudrna's The Distribution Atlas of European Butterflies (2002) is based on the observations of collaborators all over Europe and is currently being used to investigate the effect of climate change and habitat loss. In 2009, Kudrna was awarded the Marsh European Lepidoptera Award in recognition of the efforts of those whose work has had a major and positive impact on butterfly and moth conservation within Europe.

The current president is Gerhard Tarmann from the Tyrolean State Museum, which houses a sizeable entomological collection.

Notes

External links 
 SEL Field Congress 2004
 IBOL Barcode of Life
 Lepiforum
 Saturnia

Butterfly organizations
Entomological organizations
Lepidopterology